Carlos Dorrien (born 1948 in Buenos Aires, Argentina) is an American sculptor of Mexican descent.

Biography 
He studied at Montserrat School of Visual Art (now Montserrat College of Art) and at Massachusetts College of Art. He later joined the faculty of Wellesley College, where he has taught for many years.

Dorrien specializes in public art installations, creating large-sized abstract sculptures in granite that are often inspired by ancient history, architecture, archaeological ruins, and human figures. They are often designed to be placed in nature. His work is scattered throughout New England, including the DeCordova Museum in Massachusetts, Grounds for Sculpture in New Jersey, South Boston Maritime Park, Harvard Square, MBTA Alewife station, Lowell, and several other locations in the greater Boston area; most recently, at the Stamford Courthouse in Stamford, Connecticut.

Partial list of works
 Le Sombre (The Shadow) (2005)
 Justice (2005), entry plaza at the Stamford Courthouse, Stamford, Connecticut
 Little Red Riding Hood and Other Stories (2000), DeCordova Museum, Lincoln, Massachusetts
 The Alewife Gateway (1997), Minuteman Bikeway, (north side of the MBTA Alewife station), Cambridge, Massachusetts
 The Nine Muses (1990–97), Grounds for Sculpture, Hamilton Township, Mercer County, New Jersey
 Human Construction (1989), Citicorp Plaza (Figueroa & 7th Streets), Lowell
 Archival Stone (1989), courtyard of the Massachusetts State Archives
 No.7 (1987), DeCordova Museum, Lincoln, Massachusetts
 Quiet Cornerstone (1986), Winthrop Park (J.F. Kennedy & Mt. Auburn Streets), Harvard Square, Cambridge, Massachusetts
 The Gateway, South Boston Maritime Park, Boston, Massachusetts
 Ontas, station entrance of MBTA Porter Square station, Cambridge, Massachusetts

References

Modern sculptors
Public art
American artists of Mexican descent
1948 births
Living people
Massachusetts College of Art and Design alumni
Wellesley College faculty
Argentine emigrants to the United States
Montserrat College of Art alumni